Duke Dao of Jin (586–558 BC) was from 573 to 558 BC the ruler of the State of Jin, a major power during the Spring and Autumn period of ancient China. His ancestral name was Ji, given name Zhou (周), and Duke Dao was his posthumous title.

Accession to the throne
Duke Dao came from a cadet branch of the House of Ji that ruled Jin.  His grandfather Jie was one of the younger sons of Duke Xiang of Jin.  His father was named Tan, and the family had been exiled at the court of Zhou for three generations.

During the reign of Duke Dao's predecessor Duke Li, the Xi (郤) clan, led by Xi Qi (郤錡), Xi Chou (郤犨), and Xi Zhi (郤至) – together called the three Xis – was one of the most powerful clans that dominated Jin politics.  In 573 BC Duke Li struck the Xi clan and killed the three Xis.  However, two other clans, the Luan (欒氏) led by Luan Shu (欒書), and the Zhonghang (中行氏) led by Zhonghang Yan (中行偃), staged a coup d'etat and imprisoned Duke Li.  The Luan and Zhonghang clans brought back the 14-year-old Duke Dao from the Zhou court, installed him on the throne, and soon afterwards killed Duke Li.

Reign and succession
Duke Dao adopted the policies advocated by his prime minister Wei Jiang (魏絳) and made peace with the Rong and Di tribes on Jin's northern and western borders.  On the other hand, in 560 BC he led an alliance of states to invade the State of Qin, defeating Qin at the Xing River.  In 558 BC, Duke Dao died and was succeeded by his son Biao, Duke Ping of Jin.

References

Monarchs of Jin (Chinese state)
6th-century BC Chinese monarchs
586 BC births
558 BC deaths